An Evans balance, also known as a Johnson-Matthey balance (after a commercial producer of the Evans balance) is a device for measuring magnetic susceptibility. Magnetic susceptibility is related to the force experienced by a substance in a magnetic field. Various practical devices are available for the measurement of susceptibility, which differ in the shape of the magnetic field and the way the force is measured.

In the Gouy balance there is a homogeneous field in the central region between two (flat) poles of a permanent magnet or an electromagnet. The sample, in the form of a powder in a cylindrical tube, is suspended in such a way that one end lies in the center of the field and the other is effectively outside the magnetic field. The force is measured by an analytical balance.

The Evans balance employs a similar sample configuration but measures the force on the magnet.

Mechanism

Two pairs of magnets are placed back to back on a suspension strip making a balanced system with a magnetic field at each end. When a sample, which is fixed in a glass tube holder, is introduced into the field of one magnet, it experiences a force that deflects the beam. The deflection is detected by an optical transducer. A magnetic field is generated at the second magnet which, by negative feedback, restores the beam to its original position. The magnetic field required to do it is generated by passing a current through a coil of wire. One end of this wire is between the poles of the second magnet. The current required to do this is proportional to the force exerted on the first magnet. There is a second coil of wire that creates an electrical zero and a copper sheet that can critically dampen the system.

The original Evans balance was described by the English scientist Dennis F. Evans in 1973, based on a torsional balance developed in 1937 by Alexander Rankine. Evans used Ticonal bars with cadmium-plated mild steel yokes as the magnets, a Johnson Matthey gold alloy (hence the other name of the balance) for the suspension strip, all glued together with epoxy resin onto a phosphor brown spacer. The tubes were made from NMR tubes and the current came from CdS photocells. This original was modified with help from the Johnson Matthey company. Two pairs of magnets were glued between the arms of an H-frame. The sample was placed into the gap between one pair of magnets and a small coil in the gap between the second pair of magnets. This entire construction pivoted horizontally around a torsion strip. When a sample tube was placed between the first pair of magnets, the torsional force was restored by the current passed through the coil between the second pair of magnets, giving a reading on a display instead of a Helipot (as was used in the original).

Advantages vs alternative magnetic balances
The main advantage of this system is that it is cheap to construct as it does not require a precision weighing device. It is also more convenient to use than the Gouy and Faraday balances. These systems were very sensitive and accurate but were very time-consuming. One reason that they were time-consuming is that the sample had to be suspended in between the two poles of a very powerful magnet. The tube had to be suspended in the same place every time in order for the apparatus constant to be accurate. In the case of the Gouy balance, static charge on the glass tube often caused the tube to stick to magnets. With the Evans balance, a reading could be taken in a matter of seconds with only small sacrifices in sensitivity and accuracy. A Johnson-Matthey balance has a range from 0.001 x 10−7 to 1.99 x 10−7  c.g.s. volume susceptibility units. Even the original Evans balance had an accuracy within 1% of literature values for diamagnetic solutions and within 2% of literature values of paramagnetic solids.

The system allows for measurements of solid, liquid, and gaseous forms of a wide range of paramagnetic and diamagnetic materials. For each measurement, only around 250 mg of sample is required (50 mg can be used for a thin-bore sample tube).

Calibration 
The Evans balance measures susceptibility indirectly by referring to a calibration standard of known susceptibility. The most convenient compound for this purpose is mercury cobalt thiocyanate, HgCo(NCS)4, which has a susceptibility of 16.44×10−6 (±0.5%) CGS at 20 °C. Another common calibration standard is [Ni(en)]SO which has a susceptibility of 1.104 x 10−5 erg G−2 cm−3. Three readings of the meter are needed, of an empty tube, R0 of the tube filled with calibrant and of the tube filled with the sample, Rs. Some balances have an auto-tare feature that eliminates the need for the R0 measurement. Accuracy depends somewhat on homogeneous packing of the sample. The first two provide a calibration constant, C. The mass susceptibility in grams is calculated as

where L is the length of the sample, C is the calibration constant (usually 1 if it has been calibrated), and m is its mass in grams. The reading for the empty tube is needed because the tube glass is diamagnetic. There is a V term multiplied by an A term in the most general form of the equation. These two terms (V∗A) are collectively added to the numerator in the above equation. The V term is the volume susceptibility of air (0.029 x 10−6 erg G−2  cm−3) and A is the cross-sectional area of the sample. These two terms can be ignored for solid samples, yielding the original equation written above.

To calculate the volume magnetic susceptibility (χ) instead of the weigh susceptibility (χg), such as in a liquid sample, the equation would have the extra V term added to the numerator and instead of being divided by m, the equation would be divided by d for the density of the solution.

References 

Magnetometers